The 1962 Boston University Terriers football team was an American football team that represented Boston University as an independent during the 1962  NCAA University Division football season. In its sixth season under head coach Steve Sinko, the team compiled a 2–7 record and was outscored by a total of 156 to 94.

Schedule

References

Boston University
Boston University Terriers football seasons
Boston University Terriers football